The ballyhoo halfbeak or ballyhoo (Hemiramphus brasiliensis) is a baitfish of the halfbeak family (Hemiramphidae). It is similar to the Balao halfbeak (H. balao) in most features.  Ballyhoo are frequently used as cut bait and for trolling purposes by saltwater sportsmen. The fish is reported to have caused ciguatera poisoning in humans.

Also known as balahu, redtailed balao, and yellowtail ballyhoo, ballyhoo can be seen above the waters skimming the surface to escape from their predators.  The appearance is similar to  skipping stones on the water.

Description
The body shows typical halfbeak shape with an elongated lower jaw and cylindrical elongated body. They have no spines on fins, but do have 13-14 rays of their dorsal fins and 12-13 rays on their anal fins. The longest recorded Jumping halfbeak was 55 cm long, but most do not exceed 35 cm. There is no ridge between nostril and eye. It feeds mainly on sea grasses and small fish.

Distribution and habitat
Ballyhoo is distributed in tropical-warm temperate latitudes on both sides of the Atlantic. In Florida, USA, they inhabit shallow bank areas or grassflats associated with coral reefs.

References

McBride, Richard S., and Paul E. Thurman. 2003. Reproductive Biology of Hemiramphus brasiliensis and H. balao (Hemiramphidae): Maturation, Spawning Frequency, and Fecundity. Biol. Bull. 204: 57–67. 
Temporal Dynamics of Reproduction in Hemiramphus brasiliensis (Osteichthyes: Hemiramphidae)

External links
 

Ballyhoo
Fish of the Atlantic Ocean
Fish described in 1758
Taxa named by Carl Linnaeus